Itô's theorem is a result in the mathematical discipline of representation theory due to Noboru Itô.  It generalizes the well-known result that the dimension of an irreducible representation of a group must divide the order of that group.

Statement
Given an irreducible representation  of a finite group  and a maximal normal abelian subgroup , the dimension of  must divide .

References
 
 

Representation theory